Air Tamajeq (Tayiṛt) is a variety of Tamasheq, one of the Tuareg languages. It is spoken by the Tuareg people inhabiting the Aïr Mountains of the Agadez Region in Niger.

Ethnologue lists two dialects: Air (Tayert) and Tanassfarwat (Tamagarast/Tamesgrest). Blench (2006) considers these two varieties to be distinct languages. He lists Ingal and Gofat as dialects of Air/Tayirt and Azerori as a dialect of Tamesgrest.

Phonology

Vowels

Consonants 

 Sounds [tʃ] and [dʒ] mainly occur as allophones of /t/ and /d/ before front vowels. A velar /ŋ/ mainly appears when followed by a labio-velar /w/, or a uvular /q/.

References

Berbers in Niger
Tuareg languages
Languages of Niger